This is a list of sports played in the Summer and Winter Universiades organised by the International University Sports Federation (FISU).

Summer Universiades

Winter Universiades

See also
 Sports at the Olympic Games
 Asian Games sports

References

Sports at multi-sport events by competition
Universiade